Claude Mandonnaud (born 2 April 1950 in Limoges) is a retired French freestyle swimmer who won two medals at the 1966 and 1974 European Aquatics Championships. She also participated in the 1968 and 1972 Summer Olympics with the best achievement of sixth place in the 200 m freestyle event in 1968.

References

1950 births
Living people
Sportspeople from Limoges
Olympic swimmers of France
Swimmers at the 1968 Summer Olympics
Swimmers at the 1972 Summer Olympics
European Aquatics Championships medalists in swimming
French female freestyle swimmers